Rocky Moran, Sr. (born February 3, 1950 in Pasadena, California) is a retired American race car driver.  Moran, Sr. started three Indianapolis  races (1988, 1989, and 1990 Indianapolis 500) with a best finish of 14th in 1989.

Moran also teamed with P. J. Jones and Mark Dismore to win the 1993 24 Hours of Daytona event.

Moran is the father of racer Rocky Moran Jr.  With his son, Moran, Sr. opened the Moran Raceway kart track in Beaumont, California in June 2003. One mile in length the track boasted 19 turns, 860 ft. long straight, and a top speed by 125cc shifter karts of nearly 100 mph. There were six different track configurations; however, most preferred to run the full distance. In 2007, the track was closed.

American Open-Wheel racing results

PPG Indycar Series

(key) (Races in bold indicate pole position)

 ''1 Did not appear

References

1950 births
24 Hours of Daytona drivers
American racing drivers
Champ Car drivers
Indianapolis 500 drivers
Living people
People from Beaumont, California
Racing drivers from California
A. J. Foyt Enterprises drivers